Accent on Youth was an Australian music variety television series that aired briefly on the Nine Network in 1958, from 25 January to around October, on Sydney station TCN-9. It evolved into a new series titled Bandstand, based on the United States series American Bandstand, which debuted shortly after Accent on Youth ended. Originally presented by John Godson, it quickly acquired TV news anchor Brian Henderson as new host. A music series aimed at teenagers, it evolved from the Nine's former music program  TV Disc Jockey series. Broadcast on Saturdays, Accent was originally a 30-minute show aired at 6:00pm, later moved to 2:30pm and expanded to an hour at 2:00pm.

References

External links

Nine Network original programming
1958 Australian television series debuts
1958 Australian television series endings
Australian music television series
Pop music television series
Black-and-white Australian television shows
English-language television shows